Frank Leon Allen (August 26, 1889 – July 30, 1933) was a pitcher in Major League Baseball. He pitched from 1912 to 1917 for the Brooklyn Dodgers/Robins, Pittsburgh Rebels and Boston Braves.

He was the first person to throw a no-hitter and no-run game in the Federal League.

References

External links

1889 births
1933 deaths
People from Hale County, Alabama
Baseball players from Alabama
Major League Baseball pitchers
Brooklyn Dodgers players
Brooklyn Robins players
Pittsburgh Rebels players
Boston Braves players
Mobile Sea Gulls players
Gadsden Eagles players
Talladega Indians players
Rhodes Lynx baseball players
Southwestern Pirates baseball players